Anna Blackwell (pseudonym, Fidelitas; 21 June 1816 – 4 January 1900) was a British writer, journalist, and translator who focused on spiritual and social issues. She had a long and successful career as Parisian correspondent of leading colonial papers. She also wrote poetry, fairy tales, and essays on occult subjects. As a teacher and journalist, she exercised a wide influence in the U.S. and in France.

Early life and education
Anna Blackwell was born at Bristol on 21 June 1816. Her parents were Samuel Blackwell and Hannah (Lane) Blackwell. Her brother, Henry, was an American advocate for social and economic reform who co-founded the Republican Party and the American Woman Suffrage Association. Her brother, Samuel, was an abolitionist. There were two other brothers, John and George. Of the sisters, Elizabeth was the first woman to receive a medical degree in the United States, while Emily was the third. Sarah was an artist. Their sister-in-law, Antoinette Brown Blackwell, was the first woman to be ordained as a mainstream Protestant minister in the United States.

Governesses provided her education.

Career
In 1832, she removed to the United States with her family. Between 1838 and 1842, Blackwell and two of her sisters ran a school in Cincinnati.

She then removed to France, where (in Paris) she resided as a newspaper correspondent for forty-two years. She contributed to Once a Week, English Woman's Journal, The Ladies' Repository, and other publications. In later life, Blackwell she lived at Triel, France.

Blackwell was an Associationist being conversant with the social reorganization theories of Charles Fourier, and advocated cooperative methods as opposed to individual and competitive enterprise. She also became a member of the Brook Farm community, near Boston, Massachusetts.

Blackwell was a spiritualist. In 1873, the Eclectic Magazine announced that Blackwell had printed for private circulation a pamphlet entitled "Spiritualism and Spiritism", which contained what the magazine described as "some rather strange revelations". The publication went on to say that Blackwell informed the editors that she had authentic evidence, revealed to her by two spirits, that so far back as the year 3543 B.C. she held the distinguished position of a Princess of Abyssinia. It was her father of that date who first communicated this to her, and the intelligence has since been confirmed by another spirit.

In 1875, the Spiritualist Association of Great Britain offered two prizes for essays upon 'the Probable Effect of Spiritualism upon the Social, Moral, and Religious Condition of Society', the first of which was won by Blackwell. She also translated Allan Kardec's works from the French, besides writing in the spiritual press numerous articles explaining and defending reincarnation, many years prior to the advent of Helena Blavatsky. Chapman and Hall published a volume of her poems which illustrate the spirit and aspirations of her life, especially those entitled "The Bishop's Banquet" and "A Vision--of human life as it is, and might, and should be". Blackwell also wrote and translated several works on social questions, her last book, entitled Whence and Whither having been published by G. Redway in 1898. Spence's Encyclopædia of Occultism (1920) mentions her briefly, only stating that Blackwell endeavoured without success to establish the doctrine of reincarnation in England.

Death and legacy
Blackwell died on 4 January 1900 in Hastings. Some of her correspondence and that of other family members is held in Blackwell family papers collection at Duke University.

Selected works

Books
 Philosophy of Existence, 1871
 Poems, 1883
 Whence and Whither? Or, Correlation between Philosophic Convictions and Social Forms., 1898

Translations
 The Spirits' Book, by Allan Kardec
 The Medium's Book, by Allan Kardec
 Heaven and Hell, by Allan Kardec
 Jacques, George Sand
 The Little Gypsy, Elie Sauvage

Essays
 "The Probable Effect of Spiritism Upon the Social, Moral, and Religious Condition of Society"
 "The Church of the Future"

Pamphlets
 "Spiritualism and Spiritism"

References

Attribution

Bibliography

External links
 

1816 births
1900 deaths
19th-century British non-fiction writers
19th-century British journalists
19th-century British poets
19th-century British translators
19th-century British women writers
19th-century British writers
British women journalists
British women poets
Fourierists
Writers from Bristol
19th-century pseudonymous writers
Pseudonymous women writers